AG Bear (short for Almost Grown Bear) is a talking teddy bear that responds to the sound of human voice. He was designed by Ron Milner, and manufactured by Axlon, a company formed by Nolan Bushnell, founder of Atari and Chuck E. Cheese, through his Catalyst Technologies venture capital firm. The manufacturer's tag lists the bear's production date as 1985. The bear wears a durable collared blue shirt with its name embroidered in yellow letters on the front. The shirt has a velcro strap in the back and the bear has a zipper that secures the internal black voice box.

Description
The bear was a commercial success due to its interactive capabilities: AG Bear is equipped with a voice box which was originally intended to mimic the intonation of the human voice or other sounds in the environment, but expectations changed when children discovered that AG could respond with a spontaneous voice. AG Bear's voice is synth with some "growling". The company referred to this as "bear talk". When two AG bears are placed beside each other, they interact once one of them starts talking (sound is what makes AG bear react, so the sound of one AG Bear would set the other one talking, and so on). 

AG Bear was released in several different fur colors: the traditional bear is brown, while other bear colors include white and grey. AG's traditional clothing is a blue corduroy shirt with a gold AG Bear monogram, although a red corduroy version also exists.  Several other versions of the bear were released over time, including GrandPaw AG, GrandMaw AG, Bearonica (AG's sister), and several Baby AG's.

When Axlon was eventually sold to Hasbro, AG Bear production was halted.  But in the late 1990s, a multi-year lobbying effort resulted in an agreement to resume production of the original AG in a limited run edition.

See also
 Teddy Ruxpin
 Furby

External links

AG Fan Site
All the A. G. Bears pics

Teddy bears
1980s toys